Las Cumbres is a corregimiento in Panamá District, Panamá Province, Panama with a population of 32,867 as of 2010. Its population as of 1990 was 56,547; its population as of 2000 was 92,519. Neighborhoods in this sector include Villa Campestre, El Lago, Las Cumbrecitas, Las Glorietas, San Andrés, Altavista, El Rocio, Las Lajas, Villa Grecia and Colonial Las Cumbres.

References

Corregimientos of Panamá Province
Populated places in Panamá Province
Panamá District